Maria Sorolis is an American politician who served as a member of the Kentucky House of Representatives from 2019 to 2021

Career 

In 2016, Sorolis ran for election to represent District 48 in the Kentucky House of Representatives, but lost to Republican Ken Fleming. She ran again in 2018 and won. She ran for another term in 2020 and was narrowly defeated by Fleming.

She was a member of the Louisville Metropolitan Caucus, the Kentucky Nonprofit Caucus, and the Women's Caucus.

Electoral record 

In 2018, Sorolis was unopposed in the Democratic primary.

Personal life 

Sorolis earned a Bachelor of Arts in Public Policy from Duke University and a JD from the University of Georgia School of Law. She has three children and lives in Louisville, Kentucky.

References 

Living people
Democratic Party members of the Kentucky House of Representatives
21st-century American politicians
Year of birth missing (living people)